BMW M62 is a naturally aspirated V8 petrol engine which was produced from 1995 to 2005. A successor to the BMW M60, the M62 features an aluminium engine block and a single row timing chain.

In 1998, a Technical Update included VANOS (variable valve timing) for the intake camshafts.

The S62 engine is the BMW M high performance version of the M62, which was released in the E39 M5, BMW Z8, Ascari KZ1, and the Ascari A10.

Design 
Like the BMW M60 engine it replaced, the M62 is a DOHC engine with four valves per cylinder, an aluminum block and aluminum heads. The M62 has fracture-split forged connecting rods, hypereutectic pistons with ferrous coated side skirts. Most of the M62 engines used Alusil for the block material, however some early M62 engines used Nikasil cylinder coating instead.

Alusil technology integrates silicon throughout the aluminum cast so that liners or treated bores within this block family are not needed.

The M62 uses a Bosch Motronic 5.2 engine control unit (also called "DME") and a hot wire MAF.

Technical Update 
In 1998, a "Technical Update" was applied to the M62, resulting in the M62TU variants. New features include single-VANOS (variable valve timing for the intake camshaft) and electronic throttle control. The engine management was updated to Motronic ME7.2.

Versions
Figures specified are for European models.

M62B35

Applications:
 1996–1998 BMW 5 Series (E39) 535i
 1996–1998 BMW 7 Series (E38) 735i/735iL

M62TUB35
In 1998, the Technical Update was applied, resulting in the M62TUB35. Versions used in the E39 5 Series application have slightly more power than versions used in the E38 7 Series.

Applications:
 1998–2001 BMW 7 Series (E38) 735i/735iL - 
 1998–2003 BMW 5 Series (E39) 535i -

M62B44

Applications:
 1996–1998 BMW 5 Series (E39) 540i
 1996–1998 BMW 7 Series (E38) 740i/740iL
 1997–1999 BMW 8 Series (E31) 840Ci

M62TUB44

In 1998, the Technical Update was applied, resulting in the M62TUB44.

Applications:
 1998–2003 BMW 5 Series (E39) 540i
 1999–2001 BMW 7 Series (E38) 740i/740iL
 1999–2003 BMW X5 (E53) X5 4.4i
 2000–2004 Morgan Aero 8
 2002–2005 Range Rover

M62TUB46
The M62TUB46 is based on the M62TUB44. Revisions include full metal vanos hubs. 10.5mm lift intake and exhaust camshafts. Stronger valve springs. Underdriven crank shaft drive pulley. Two-piece oil scraper ring instead of three-pieces. 93 mm pistons with reduced height due to the increased stroke.

Applications:
 1999–2001 Alpina B10 V8
 2000–2004 Morgan Aero 8 GTN
 2002–2004 BMW X5 (E53) X5 4.6is

Alpina F3
The Alpina F3 was developed by Alpina and based on the M62B44 engine. Released late in 1996 it used a modified M62B44 block supplied to Alpina from BMW featuring a bore of 93mm. It also featured a modified cylinder head, different intake camshafts, a crankshaft with increased stroke along with different pistons, a different air intake manifold and exhaust manifolds as well as custom engine programming.

Applications:
 1996-1998 Alpina B10 V8

Alpina F4
Following with updates to the regular production M62B44 the F4 was a revised version of the Alpina F3 engine and featured variable valve timing on the intake camshafts, an electronically controlled throttle body and a slight increase in power. The Alpina F4 received a revision into the F4/1 in late 2000 which slightly increased fuel efficiency while decreasing its emissions output although power output remained the same.

Applications:
 1998-2000 Alpina B10 V8
 2000-2002 Alpina B10 V8/1

Alpina F5
The F5 was Alpina's final iteration of the M62B44 engine, it featured all the same technology as the F4/1 but with an increased displacement due to an increased stroke thanks to a modified crankshaft. The increased stroke necessitated an oil pan with additional clearance as well as revised intake camshafts and exhaust camshafts from the M62B46 production engine.

Applications:
 2002-2004 Alpina B10 V8S
 2002-2003 Alpina Roadster V8

Racing Dynamics R52
Based on the production M62B44 the Racing Dyamics R52 engine featured a billet crankshaft, special pistons with stock connecting rods and a modified cylinder head which work together to raise the compression ratio to 11.3:1. It also features custom tubular exhaust manifolds, different camshafts and a modified engine computer which lets the engine spin to its 7,200 rpm redline.

Applications:
 1999-2001 Racing Dynamics R52 Sport

S62

The BMW S62 engine (full model code S62B50) is the high-performance variant of the M62, which is fitted to the E39 M5 and the E52 Z8. The S62 was BMW's first V8 engine to have double-VANOS (variable valve timing on the intake and exhaust camshafts).

The redline is 7000 rpm.

Other differences compared to the M62 include:
 Individual throttle bodies for each of the eight cylinders, which are electronically actuated and have driver-selectable "normal" and "sport" mode throttle response.
 Compression ratio is 11.0:1, compared with 10.0:1 for the M62
 A double-row timing chain, compared with the single-row chain used by the M62
 Hollow camshafts. 
 Engine control unit is a Siemens MSS 52
 Dual air intakes and mass flow sensors
 A semi-dry sump oil system, consisting of two additional scavenging pumps which activates during hard cornering

Like the M62, the S62 has an aluminium block and head. The S62 was assembled at BMW's Dingolfing plant.

Applications:
 1998–2003 BMW M5 (E39)
 2000–2003 BMW Z8
 2005–2010 Ascari KZ1
 2006 Ascari A10

Bentley Arnage 
The 1998-2000 Bentley Arnage (Green Label) is powered by a Cosworth-developed twin-turbo version of the M62B44.

References

M62
V8 engines
Gasoline engines by model